Sichuanese Pinyin (Si4cuan1hua4 Pin1yin1), is a romanization system specifically designed for the Chengdu dialect of Sichuanese. It is mostly used in selected Sichuanese dictionaries, such as the Sichuan Dialect Dictionary, Sichuan Dialect's Vocabulary Explanation, and the Chengdu Dialect Dictionary. Sichuanese Pinyin is based on Hanyu Pinyin, the only Chinese romanization system officially instructed within the People's Republic of China, for convenience amongst users. However, there is also the problem that it is unable to match the phonology of Sichuanese with complete precision, especially in the case for the Minjiang dialect, as there are many differences between Sichuanese and Standard Chinese in phonology.

Scheme

Initials
Below each IPA symbol in the table below are the letters which correspond to their respective sounds in Sichuanese Pinyin, and a sample Chinese character with that initial:

Finals
Below each IPA symbol in the table below are the letters which correspond to their respective sounds in Sichuanese Pinyin, and a sample Chinese character with that syllable rime:

Tones
The Sichuanese Pinyin system uses superscript numbers to mark the four tones of Chengdu dialect. The number is placed on the top right corner of every syllable, where "1" stands for the first tone, "2" stands for the second tone, and so forth.

Rules
The rules of Sichuanese Pinyin are based on those of Hanyu Pinyin.

Sample text
The following sample text is a selection of Sichuanese idioms in Sichuanese Pinyin, Scuanxua Latinxua Sin Wenz (in Sichuanese) and Hanyu Pinyin (in Standard Mandarin pronunciation), for comparative purposes:

References

Romanization of Chinese
Phonetic alphabets
Phonetic guides
Ruby characters
Pinyin